The Montreal Juniors were a junior ice hockey team in the Quebec Major Junior Hockey League from 1975 to 1982. They played at the Montreal Forum in Montreal, Quebec, Canada.

History
The Montreal Bleu Blanc Rouge were renamed in 1975, becoming the Montreal Juniors. The most famous graduate from the team is Denis Savard. The team played for seven seasons as the Montreal Juniors before moving to Verdun.

Players

Award winners

Robert Lebel Trophy(Team with the best Goals Against Average)
Montreal Juniors 1981-82

Michel Brière Commemorative Trophy(Most valuable player)
1977-78 Kevin Reeves 
1979-80 Denis Savard

Jacques Plante Commemorative Trophy(Best Goals Against Average) 
1981-82 Jeff Barratt

Emile Bouchard Trophy(Defenseman of the year)
1976-77 Robert Picard
1977-78 Mark Hardy  

Instructor's Trophy(Offensive Rookie of the Year)
1977-78 Denis Savard (co-winner)

Raymond Lagacé Trophy(Offensive Rookie of the Year) 
1980-81 Billy Campbell

Frank J. Selke Commemorative Trophy(Most sportsmanlike player) 
1975-76 Normand Dupont 
1977-78 Kevin Reeves

Marcel Robert Trophy(Scholastic player of the year) 
1980-81 François Lecomte

Hall of Fame alumni
Two members of the Montreal Juniors would be enshrined in the HHOF. One of them played for the Juniors, the other was one of the team's coaches.

Denis Savard was a local superstar and centreman, who played three seasons with the Juniors racking up 455 points in three years. He would go on to play many years for the Chicago Blackhawks, and won a Stanley Cup with the Montreal Canadiens in 1993.
 
Jacques Laperrière was a defenseman, part of many Montreal Canadiens championship teams. After retiring as a player, Laperrière took on the position of coach of the Montreal Juniors prior to the 1975-76 season. Partway through the following year he resigned, as the pressure and violence at the amateur level caused him to sour on his new profession.

NHL alumni

Yearly results

Regular season

Playoffs
1975-1976 Lost to Cornwall Royals 4 games to 2 in quarter-finals.
1976-1977 Defeated Chicoutimi Saguenéens 9 points to 7 in quarter-finals. Lost to Quebec Remparts 9 points to 1 in semi-finals. 
1977-1978 Defeated Verdun Eperviers 8 points to 0 in quarter-finals. Defeated Cornwall Royals 8 points to 2 in semi-finals. Lost to Trois-Rivières Draveurs 8 points to 0 in finals. 
1978-1979 Defeated Quebec Remparts 8 points to 4 in quarter-finals. Lost to Trois-Rivières Draveurs 8 points to 2 in semi-finals.  
1979-1980 Defeated Quebec Remparts 4 games to 1 in quarter-finals.  Lost to Sherbrook Castors 4 games to 1 in semi-finals.  
1980-1981 Lost to Trois-Rivières 4 games to 3 in quarter-finals. 
1981-1982 Eliminated by finishing 7th place in an 8 team round-robin. (5 wins, 9 losses)

Defunct Quebec Major Junior Hockey League teams
Jun
Ice hockey clubs established in 1975
Ice hockey clubs disestablished in 1982
1975 establishments in Quebec
1982 disestablishments in Quebec